Self Regional Healthcare, previously Self Memorial Hospital, is a 358-bed short-term acute care hospital founded on November 1, 1951 in Greenwood, South Carolina. Currently there are over 200 practicing physicians employed by Self Regional Healthcare.

History 

Self Regional Healthcare opened in 1951 and operates as one of the state’s finest regional hospitals, an ongoing tribute to James C. Self House founder of Greenwood Mills.  The healthcare system serves Greenwood, Laurens, Abbeville, Newberry, McCormick, Saluda, and Edgefield counties.

In September 2017, Self announced it will lease Edgefield County Hospital’s facilities and equipment and manage the site as part of its own system. This would add 25 beds to the system. 

In June 2017 a jury awarded $1 million in a malpractice suit against Self Regional Healthcare and physician Mark Robirds.

In July 2014 a data breach occurred after the theft of an employee laptop.

In June 2022, Self Regional announced plans to affiliate with Abbeville Area Medical Center. The integration process is expected to be completed during mid 2023.

Awards and certifications 
Self Regional Healthcare is a 13-time winner of the Gallup Great Workplace Award. It's verified by the American College of Surgeons as a Level 3 Trauma Center.

According to Healthgrades Self Regional ranked among America’s 100 Best Hospitals for Spine Surgery Award in 2021 and 2023.

See also 

 List of hospitals in South Carolina

References 

Buildings and structures in Greenwood, South Carolina
Hospitals in South Carolina
1951 establishments in South Carolina
Hospitals established in 1951